Blackwell v Blackwell [1929] UKHL 1 is an English trusts law case, concerning the doctrine of secret trusts.

Facts
A testator gave £12,000 in a codicil to five people on trust, saying they should invest using their discretion and ‘to apply the income.... for the purposes indicated by me to them.’ Four were told the general objects, and the fifth got detailed instructions. All accepted. The fifth also made a memorandum of the testator’s instructions, but a few hours after the codicil was executed. The residuary legatees claimed that any trust was invalid, because parol evidence was inadmissible to establish the testator’s purposes.

Eve J held the evidence was admissible. Court of Appeal agreed with Eve J, so there was a valid secret trust.

Judgment
The House of Lords held that the secret trust was valid, because the details were laid out around the same time as the execution of the codicil to the will.

Lord Buckmaster said the following.

Viscount Sumner said that the doctrine that trusts would be recognised to prevent “fraud” did not conflict with the various Wills Acts, a ‘perfectly normal exercise of general equitable jurisdiction.’

See also

English trusts law

Notes

References

English trusts case law
House of Lords cases
1929 in British law
1929 in case law